Frederic Alonzo Carrington  (Oct 1807 – 15 July 1901) was a 19th-century New Zealand politician and surveyor. He is regarded as the Father of New Plymouth.

Carrington was born in Chelmsford, Essex, England, in 1807, the son of Captain William Carrington.

He was 15 years in the Ordnance Survey Department. Then he was appointed by the New Zealand Company as Chief Surveyor to the Plymouth Company and surveyed the new settlement of New Plymouth. He arrived in Wellington with his family in the ship London in December 1840 as a cabin passenger.

In 1844, he returned to England, and undertook surveying for parliamentary committees in England and Scotland. In 1851, he displayed iron made from Taranaki iron sand at The Great Exhibition, London. From 1851 to 1856 he investigated business proposals in California and other parts of America, Paris and Belgium.

He left for New Zealand with his family in January 1857 and in 1862 was made Government Engineering Surveyor for Taranaki. He finally obtained a grant of land in 1877.

 

  
He was Superintendent of Taranaki Province from 1869 to 1876 (when the Provinces were abolished), and was the member of Parliament for Omata in 1870 and then Grey and Bell from 1871 to 1879 when he retired.

He was a member of the Harbour Board (now Port Taranaki), and an advocate of an adequate harbour for New Plymouth. In 1881, Carrington laid the first stone for the main breakwater at the port, using a trowel made from Taranaki ironsand.

Carrington died in New Plymouth and is buried in the family grave in Te Henui Cemetery.

Carrington Street, a New Plymouth arterial route, and its extension Carrington Road, which winds between the Pouakai and Kaitake ranges, are named for him. He is regarded as the father of New Plymouth.

Notes

References

1807 births
1901 deaths
Superintendents of New Zealand provincial councils
Members of the New Zealand House of Representatives
New Zealand surveyors
English surveyors
People from Chelmsford
People from New Plymouth
Burials at Te Henui Cemetery
New Zealand MPs for North Island electorates
English emigrants to New Zealand
19th-century New Zealand politicians